Bird Songs: The Final Recordings is a live album trumpeter Dizzy Gillespie with an array of guest stars recorded at the Blue Note Jazz Club, New York City in 1992 and released on the Telarc label. The album, along with To Bird with Love and To Diz with Love, represent the last recordings made by the legendary trumpeter before his death in 1993.

Reception
The Allmusic review stated "This album and its companions might have worked better as videos, where one could still bask in Dizzy's live presence and thus experience the atmosphere of this celebration more fully".

Track listing
All compositions by Dizzy Gillespie except as indicated
 "Ornithology" (Benny Harris, Charlie Parker) – 15:31
 "Con Alma" – 9:20
 "Confirmation" (Parker) – 10:41
 "A Night in Tunisia" (Dizzy Gillespie, Frank Paparelli) – 21:46
 "The Diamond Jubilee Blues" – 4:14
 "Theme" – 1:26

Personnel
Dizzy Gillespie – trumpet
Antonio Hart (track 3), Paquito D'Rivera (track 1), Jackie McLean (track 1) – alto saxophone
Benny Golson (tracks 4–6), Clifford Jordan (track 3), David Sánchez (tracks 4–6) – tenor saxophone
Danilo Pérez – piano
George Mraz – bass
Kenny Washington (tracks 4–6), Lewis Nash (tracks 1–3) – drums
Bobby McFerrin – vocals (track 1)

References 

Telarc Records live albums
Dizzy Gillespie live albums
1992 live albums
Albums recorded at the Blue Note Jazz Club